The House in the Middle is the title of two American documentary film shorts (13 minutes), respectively from 1953 and 1954, which showed the effects of a nuclear bomb test on a set of three small houses. The black-and-white 1953 film was created by the Federal Civil Defense Administration to attempt to show that a clean, freshly painted house (the middle house) is more likely to survive a nuclear attack than its poorly maintained counterparts (the right and left houses). A color version was released the next year by the American Coatings Association, a "bureau" invented by the National Paint, Varnish and Lacquer Association trade group (now known as the American Coatings Association).

In 2001, the Library of Congress deemed the 1954 film "culturally, historically, or aesthetically significant" and selected it for preservation in the National Film Registry.

Footage for the film was recorded during the Upshot-Knothole Encore test at the Nevada Test Site on May 8, 1953.

Cast

See also
 Fallout Protection
 The Bomb

References

External links
 
 
 
 The House in the Middle essay by Kelly Chisholm on the National Film Registry web site 
 The House in the Middle essay by Daniel Eagan in America's Film Legacy: The Authoritative Guide to the Landmark Movies in the National Film Registry, A&C Black, 2010 , pages 483-484. America's Film Legacy: The Authoritative Guide to the Landmark Movies in the National Film Registry
 Internet Archive copy of the 1954 film
 Library of Congress copy of the 1953 film
 Library of Congress copy of the 1954 film

1953 films
1954 films
American documentary films
United States National Film Registry films
Documentary films about nuclear war and weapons
Documentary films about the Cold War
American social guidance and drug education films
Sponsored films
1953 documentary films
1954 documentary films
1950s American films